Orest Grechka (born 20 December 1975) is a Ukrainian-American former soccer player who is also known to have played for Moss FK of the Norwegian Premier League from 2000 to 2001.

Norway
He went to Norway after playing for Hannover 96 II in Germany. Completing a two-year deal with Norway's Moss FK in 2000, Grechka was the first of their new imports to arrive, debuting on the 81st minute in a 1–0 defeat to Brann. However, on account of pulling a hamstring muscle shortly after, the forward was left out for 4–6 weeks if his condition retrogressed, eventually cancelling his contract in August 2001.

References

External links 
 Altomfootball.no Profile
 

1975 births
Living people
American soccer players
American expatriate soccer players
American expatriate soccer players in Germany
American expatriate sportspeople in Norway
American people of Ukrainian descent
Association football forwards
Eliteserien players
Expatriate footballers in Norway
Hartwick College alumni
Moss FK players